The Opéra d'Avignon is an opera house located in Avignon, France that has been in operation for almost two centuries. The initial opera house was constructed in 1824–1825, and opened with its inaugural performance on 30 October 1825. The original opera house was destroyed in a fire on 26 January 1846. The current opera house was built in 1846–1847 and was designed by architects Léon Feuchère and Théodore Charpentier.

References

Sources
 

Opera houses in France
Avignon
1825 establishments in France